Pirdop copper smelter and refinery is the biggest facility for smelting and refining of copper in South-Eastern Europe. The factory is situated between the towns of Pirdop and Zlatitsa in the Sofia Province, western Bulgaria. The plant, which was founded in 1958, had an initial annual capacity of 160,000 tons, which has been expanded to 340,000 tons at present.

In addition, it produces 830,000 tons of sulphuric acid and small amounts of silver, gold and selenium. The number of employees is 800.
Pirdop copper smelter and refinery was privatised in 1997 for $80,000,000 and belongs now to the German company Aurubis.
The main chimney of the smelter is 325.4 metres tall, 0.4 metres taller than the Maritza East power stations chimneys and 2 metres taller than the Eiffel tower.

See also 
 List of tallest structures in Bulgaria

References

Metal companies of Bulgaria
Chimneys in Bulgaria
Buildings and structures in Sofia Province